The following is a list of Radio Disney Music Award winners and nominees for Best Song That Makes You Smile.

Winners and nominees

2010s

References

Song That Makes You Smile
Song awards